The Hunterian Collection is one of the best-known collections of the University of Glasgow and is cared for by the Hunterian Museum and Art Gallery and Glasgow University Library. It contains 650 manuscripts and some 10,000 printed books, 30,000 coins and 15,000 anatomical and natural history specimens. The collection was originally assembled by the anatomist William Hunter.

History 
The collection was assembled by the anatomist and physician, William Hunter (1718–83), who was an avid collector of coins, medals, paintings, shells, minerals, books and manuscripts. Considerable purchases were made in Paris from monastic houses and private libraries, such as those of César de Missy and Jean-Baptiste Colbert. Other major acquisitions were made in Vienna and Italy.

The library and other collections remained in London after Hunter's death for the use of his nephew, the physician and pathologist, Matthew Baillie (1761–1823), as well as William Cumberland Cruikshank (1745–1800). It moved to the University of Glasgow in 1807. The coins were stored for six years in the Bank of Scotland.

Collection

Manuscripts and books
The manuscripts number around 650, of which approximately two thirds are medieval (biblical manuscripts) or Renaissance in origin; over a hundred of the remaining manuscripts are oriental (Persian and Arabic). The oldest manuscript is the Homilies of Saint Basil, dated by a colophon to the year 859. The printed books include 534 incunabula. Hunter purchased a collection of biblical manuscripts from Caesar de Missy.

About a third of Hunter's books are on the subject of medicine. They include key historical texts by authors including Hippocrates, Galen, Vesalius and William Harvey, as well as the writings of Hunter's contemporaries, such as William Smellie, Albinus and Albrecht von Haller.

Anatomical and natural history specimens
Hunter's collection contained about 15,000 specimens and preparations focusing on human anatomy and pathology, and natural history.

Coins
Hunter began to collect coins in about 1770, spending over £22,000 on them before his death in 1783. The resulting collection is believed to be the finest ever assembled by a private individual. George MacDonald estimated, "Its trays contain about 30,000 specimens, of which over 12,000 are Greek and nearly the same number Roman."

According to the Introduction of Catalogue of Greek Coins in the Hunterian Collection (MacDonald 1899), Hunter purchased many important collections, including those of Horace Walpole and the bibliophile Thomas Crofts. In 1782, in Vienna, he purchased the Hess collection, including around 700 Roman Imperial gold coins, for £2,400. King George III even donated an Athenian gold piece.

Some manuscripts 
 Minuscule 560
 Minuscule 561
 Minuscule 562
 Minuscule 563
 Lectionary 162
 Lectionary 239
 Lectionary 240
 Lectionary 241

References

Further reading 
 R. Hingston Fox William Hunter, anatomist, physician, obstetrician, (1718-1783) (London 1901)
 George MacDonald, Catalogue of Greek Coins in the Hunterian Collection, University of Glasgow (1899-1905), Volume I, Volume II, Volume III [reprinted in 2005]
 R. J. Last, Specimens from the Hunterian Collection, Journal of Bone and Joint Surgery, vol. 34 B, No 2, May 1952

External links 
 Hunterian Collection at the Hunterian Museum and Art Gallery, University of Glasgow
 Hunterian Collection at the Special Collections, University of Glasgow
 The Hunterian Collection at the Royal College of Surgeons of England
 The Hunterian coin collection

University of Glasgow Library collection